The following is a list of ecoregions in Ethiopia, as identified by the Worldwide Fund for Nature (WWF).

Terrestrial ecoregions
by major habitat type

Tropical and subtropical moist broadleaf forests

 Ethiopian montane forests

Tropical and subtropical grasslands, savannas, and shrublands

 East Sudanian savanna
 Northern Acacia–Commiphora bushlands and thickets
 Sahelian Acacia savanna
 Somali Acacia–Commiphora bushlands and thickets
 Victoria Basin forest–savanna mosaic

Montane grasslands and shrublands

 Ethiopian montane grasslands and woodlands
 Ethiopian montane moorlands

Deserts and xeric shrublands

 Ethiopian xeric grasslands and shrublands
 Masai xeric grasslands and shrublands

Freshwater ecoregions
 Ethiopian Highlands
 Lake Tana
 Northern Eastern Rift
 Lake Turkana
 Shebelle-Juba
 Upper Nile
 Lower Nile
 Western Red Sea Drainages

References
 Burgess, Neil, Jennifer D’Amico Hales, Emma Underwood (2004). Terrestrial Ecoregions of Africa and Madagascar: A Conservation Assessment. Island Press, Washington DC.
 Thieme, Michelle L. (2005). Freshwater Ecoregions of Africa and Madagascar: A Conservation Assessment. Island Press, Washington DC.

 
ecoregions
Ethiopia